DG/L is a programming language developed by Data General Corp for the Nova, Eclipse, and Eclipse/MV families of minicomputers in the 1970s and early 1980s.

There were two separate versions:

 "Old" Algol, which ran on and generated code for the Nova series of 16 bit computers.  The compiler only did a little optimization.  It was only available on the RDOS family of operating systems.
 DG/L, which was developed by extensively modifying the Fortran 5 optimizing compiler.  This compiler ran only on the Eclipse and Eclipse/MV family of computers but generated optimized code for the Nova, Eclipse and Eclipse/MV (Eagle) family.  It was available on RDOS, AOS and AOS/VS.

The language itself was an extended version of Algol 60.  It supported Integers, Single and Double precision floating point and complex numbers, and both fixed and arbitrary precision strings.  It also supported full arbitrary precision binary-coded decimal (BCD) arithmetic on strings.  It had many convenient program control flow features, but being designed in the mid 70s, lacked user defined data structures.

DG/L had a substantial runtime library for its day, and was used for systems programming both within and outside of Data General.

Originally called Algol/5, the product renamed DG/L shortly before the first commercial release in 1978.  Officially, the name is meaningless but it was apparently supposed to imply "Data General Language". After the first commercial release, targeting 16-bit Eclipse and Nova, several subsequent updates and major versions were released, approximately one a year.

Comparison with Algol 60 
Appendix A of Data General's 1982 revision of its DG/L Language Reference Manual, 093-00229-01 describes DG/L as based on the ALGOL 60 programming language, but gives "data types, operations and statements that ALGOL 60 lacks". Specific differences are:

Algol 60 features unsupported in DG/L

Extensions 
Some of the extensions to the Algol 60 standard introduced in DG/L or carried over from Data General's previous Algol implementation of 1971:

String operations
 SUBSTR - substring
 INDEX - position of a substring
 LENGTH - length of a string
 SETCURRENT - sets the current length of a string, e.g. setcurrent(str,length(str)-1);
 Concatentation operator: "!!"
 String arithmetic (e.g. "123.45" + "0.01" )
 Type conversion (Boolean, Integer, Real, Pointer, Bit)
 Octal numbers and some special symbols enclosed in brackets to represent ASCII characters

Input and output
 Fully formatted output, unformatted input, and output for all supported data types
 Full interface to Data General's RDOS, AOS and AOS/VS system calls
 Cache memory management (with virtual memory option).
 Interface to CLRE and INFOS II databases

Other extensions
 Conditional compiling of sections of code, using /**letter-digit-string <statement> */
 end-of-line comments using the % character and /* comment */
 expanded do, for, and if syntax (e.g. WHILE <boolexp1> DO <statement> UNTIL <boolexp2> )
 Types: BIT, BYTE, 16-bit and 32-bit integers, 32-bit and 64-bit reals and arbitrary precision arithmetic,
 Literals, e.g. LITERAL C (299792.458)
 Global data
 Error trapping
 External procedures and data
 Cluster declaration... very similar to Pascal units (allows a cluster of procedures and data in a separate compiled source).
 Pointer -> symbol and BASED variables of all types
 Exclusive-OR operator (XOR)
 Multitasking

References

 DG/L Compiler Reference Manual, Data General Corp, 1978
 DG/L Runtime Reference Manual, Data General Corp, 1978

Systems programming languages
Procedural programming languages
Programming languages created in 1978